Steven "Steef" van Musscher (26 February 1902 – 14 May 1986) was a Dutch triple jumper. He competed at the 1928 Olympics and finished in 15th place. In 1930 he set his personal best jump at 14.13 m.

References

1902 births
1986 deaths
Dutch male triple jumpers
Athletes (track and field) at the 1928 Summer Olympics
Olympic athletes of the Netherlands
Sportspeople from Haarlem
20th-century Dutch people